Harry Wright (September 11, 1875 – after 1943) was a financial agent and political figure in British Columbia. He represented Ymir from 1903 to 1907 and Nelson City from 1909 to 1912 in the Legislative Assembly of British Columbia as a Conservative.

He was born in Adjala township, Simcoe County, Ontario, the son of Joseph Wright, and was educated in Simcoe. In 1900, Wright married Jennie McLeod. He served as mining recorder and assessor, and later as government agent and gold commissioner for Nelson. Wright was defeated when he ran for reelection to the assembly in 1912 as an independent Conservative.

References

External links 
 

1875 births
Year of death missing
British Columbia Conservative Party MLAs
Gold commissioners in British Columbia